Walery Władysław Daniel Łoziński (1880–1944) was a Polish geographer, geomorphologist and soil scientist known for introducing the concept of periglaciation into geomorphology in 1909. Łoziński extended the work of Swedish geologist Johan Gunnar Andersson who had written about periglacial phenomena in Bjørnøya and the Falkland Islands. The concept of "periglaciation" was the subject of an intensive discussion at the 1910 International Geological Congress held in Stockholm.

References

Polish geomorphologists
Polish soil scientists
1880 births
1944 deaths
Polish geographers
Scientists from Lviv
University of Lviv alumni
Academic staff of Jagiellonian University
Burials at Rakowicki Cemetery